The DeSoto is a historic hotel at 15 East Liberty Street on Madison Square in Savannah, Georgia, constructed in 1968.  It is within the area of the Savannah Historic District, which was listed on the National Register of Historic Places in November 1966, although it is not specifically mentioned in the nomination form, because the current structure had not been built yet.

History

First Hotel DeSoto
The original Hotel DeSoto was a 300-room resort, designed by William G. Preston and built in 1890. It closed in 1965 and was demolished.

Modern Hotel DeSoto
The current structure was built on the site of the original hotel and opened in 1968 as the DeSoto Hilton. It underwent a $9.4 million renovation in 2017 and was renamed The DeSoto. It is a member of the Historic Hotels of America program, run by the National Trust for Historic Preservation.

References

External links

The DeSoto, official site

Hotels in Savannah, Georgia
Hotel buildings completed in 1968
Hotels established in 1968
Hotels established in 1890
Madison Square (Savannah) buildings
Historic Hotels of America
Savannah Historic District